Johnny Jewell (born 25 December 1958 from Dublin) is an Irish singer & lead guitarist of Irish rock band Aslan. His career of over twenty-five years has been characterized by numerous successes on the Irish charts. He co-wrote many of the band's finest songs including "Crazy World", "This Is", "Where's The Sun?", "Hurt Sometimes" to name but a few. He also wrote the memorable riffs behind the songs and is the falsetto backing vocalist behind Christy Dignam in the band. He was also in The Precious Stones during the band's split and sang vocals most notably on "Jesus Says He Loves Me" which was originally intended to be on Aslan's original second album.

During live performances he uses Takamine acoustic guitars and a Fender Telecaster.

External links
 Official site
 Review of The Platinum Collection for which Joe wrote many of the songs

Living people
Irish guitarists
Irish male guitarists
Irish songwriters
Musicians from County Dublin
1958 births